Gunder Hägg (31 December 1918 – 27 November 2004) was a Swedish runner and multiple world record breaker of the 1940s. He set over a dozen middle distance world records at events ranging from 1500 to 5000 meters, including three at both the 1500 meters and the mile, one at 3000 meters and one at 5000 meters.

Hägg and fellow Swede, Arne Andersson, lowered the record for the mile to just over four minutes (4:01.4) – accelerating the progression of the world record in the mile run. Both athletes set three world records for the mile. Hägg first set the record in July 1942 at 4:06.2, a time which was equalled by Andersson later the same month. This record was broken by Hägg (4:04.6) in September the same year. Andersson recaptured the world record in July 1943 (4:02.6), and improved it further in July 1944 (4:01.6). However, Hägg then managed a time of 4:01.4 in Malmö in July 1945. Hägg's record was not broken until Roger Bannister ran the first sub-4 mile in Oxford in May 1954.

Hägg was also the first man to run a sub-14 minute 5000 m.

In 1946, Gunder Hägg was branded a professional because he received payments for running. He was therefore barred from competition, together with Arne Andersson and Henry Jonsson. Four years earlier, he earned the Svenska Dagbladet Gold Medal.

References

 

1918 births
2004 deaths
People from Bräcke Municipality
World record setters in athletics (track and field)
Swedish male middle-distance runners
Swedish male steeplechase runners
Sportspeople from Jämtland County